Casey Samuels is an Australian basketball player who currently plays for Sydney Uni Flames in the Women's National Basketball League (WNBL).

Personal
Samuels was born in Westmead, New South Wales on 2 August 1994.

Basketball

Samuels is a guard. She played WNBL's Australian Institute of Sport team during the 2011/2012 season. In a 14 December 2011 game against the Canberra Capitals, she was the team's leading scorer with 19 points. In an 8 February 2012 game against the Canberra Capitals, she scored 10 points in the second half. She finished the game as the team's third leading scorer with eleven points. In a January 2012 game against the Dandenong Rangers, she scored five points in game her team lost.  She was the team's second leading scorer in the game. In February 2012, before the final game of the season, West Coast Waves coach David Herbert described her as a gifted player

References

External links

 Casey Samuels: WNBL

Australian Institute of Sport basketball (WNBL) players
1994 births
Living people
Australian women's basketball players
Articles containing video clips
Forwards (basketball)